This is a partial list of those who attended Albany Law School.  Alumni are categorized by each alumnus or alumna's most distinguishing accomplishments.

Academics

Alicia Ouellette, professor at Albany Law School
Russell Conwell, founder and first President of Temple University
James A. MacAlister, former president of Drexel University
Patricia Salkin, Dean and Professor of Law, Touro College Jacob D. Fuchsberg Law Center

Judges

Orion M. Barber, Judge of the United States Court of Customs and Patent Appeals
Francis Bergan, former associate Judge, New York State Court of Appeals
David Josiah Brewer, former Associate Justice of the U.S. Supreme Court
John B. Cassoday, former Chief Justice of the Wisconsin Supreme Court
Amaro Cavalcanti, former Justice of the Supreme Court of Brazil, former Justice of the International Court of Justice at the Hague, former Mayor of Rio de Janeiro, author of Brazilian Constitution of 1891 
Lawrence H. Cooke, former Chief Judge of New York State
Richard J. Daronco, former United States Judge for the Southern District of New York
Richard K. Eaton, Judge, U.S. Court of International Trade
Michael J. Garcia, associate Judge, New York Court of Appeals, former U.S. Attorney, Southern District of New York
Domenick L. Gabrielli, associate Judge, New York Court of Appeals
James Gibson, former associate Judge, New York State Court of Appeals
Victoria A. Graffeo, former associate Judge, New York State Court of Appeals
Warner A. Graham, Associate Justice of the Vermont Supreme Court
James Stuart Holden, Judge of the United States District Court for the District of Vermont
Robert H. Jackson, former U.S. Attorney General, Associate Justice of the U.S. Supreme Court and chief United States prosecutor at the Nuremberg Trials.
John Franklin Kinney, County Court Judge, founding member of the Knights of Columbus and City of Rochester Bar Association.
Moses A. Luce, Judge of the County Court of San Diego, Medal of Honor recipient
James Loren Martin, Judge of the United States District Court for the District of Vermont
Thomas James McAvoy, Senior United States Judge for the Northern District of New York
David Myers, Justice of the Indiana Supreme Court
Alton B. Parker, former Chief Judge of New York State; Candidate for President of the United States
Percival L. Shangraw, Associate Justice of the Vermont Supreme Court (1958-1972), Chief Justice (1972-1974)
Charles J. Siragusa, Judge in the U.S. District Court for the Western District of New York
Milford K. Smith, Associate Justice of the Vermont Supreme Court
Leslie Stein, associate Judge, New York Court of Appeals
Owen P. Thompson, former judge of the Seventh Judicial District of Illinois
Bartlett Tripp, former Chief Justice of the Dakota Territory, former United States Ambassador to Austria
Irving G. Vann, former associate Judge, New York State Court of Appeals
Wheelock G. Veazey, Vermont Supreme Court Justice, Interstate Commerce Commission member, Medal of Honor recipient

Politicians

  
  
 

Warren M. Anderson, New York State Senate Majority Leader
John Mosher Bailey, former U.S. Congressman
Brian Barnwell, New York State Assembly
James K. Batchelder, Speaker of the Vermont House of Representatives
William Beidelman, former Mayor of Easton, Pennsylvania
Stephen S. Blake, former New York State Assemblyman
Alexander Campbell Botkin, Lieutenant Governor of Montana
M. William Bray, Lieutenant Governor of New York
Chauncey W. Brownell, President pro tempore of the Vermont State Senate, Secretary of State of Vermont
William T. Byrne, former U.S. Congressman
Kevin Cahill, New York State Assemblyman
Joseph L. Carrigg, former U.S. Congressman
W. Sterling Cole, former U.S. Congressman
Edwin H. Conger, former U.S. Congressman and former Ambassador to Mexico
Andrew Cuomo, former New York State Attorney General, former Governor of New York State.
Nathan F. Dixon III, U.S. senator from Rhode Island
Mary Donohue, former Lieutenant Governor of New York State
Ralph A. Foote, Lieutenant Governor of Vermont
Washington Gardner, former U.S Congressman and former Secretary of State of Michigan
Henry R. Gibson, former U.S. Congressman
Martin H. Glynn, former Governor of the State of New York
Roger W. Hulburd, Lieutenant Governor of Vermont
Charles Kellogg, former New York State Senator
Carleton J. King, former U.S. Congressman
Abraham Lansing, New York State Treasurer; State Senate. Delegate to International Conference for Codification of the Law of Nations
Mike LiPetri, former New York State Assemblyman
William Paine Lord, 9th Governor of Oregon
David O'Brien Martin, former U.S. Congressman
Joseph Homan Manley, leader of the Republican National Committee and Speaker of the Maine House of Representatives
Robert C. McEwen, former U.S. Congressman
William McKinley, 25th President of the United States
William E. Miller, former U.S. Congressman, candidate for Vice President of the United States, and Chairman of the Republican National Committee
John Morgan, former Wisconsin State Assemblyman
Dalwin J. Niles, former Judge of the Fulton County Family Court and member of the New York State Senate
Howard C. Nolan Jr., former member of the New York State Senate
Edwin Sylvanus Osborne, former U.S. Congressman and Major General of the National Guard
Amasa J. Parker Jr., former New York Assemblyman and Senator 
Frederick Walker Pitkin, 2nd Governor of Colorado
Jeanine Pirro, former Westchester County District Attorney, television host, author, and former New York State judge and politician
Harris M. Plaisted, former governor of Maine 
Redfield Proctor, former Governor of Vermont, Secretary of War, United States Senator 
John Raines, former U.S. Congressman, New York State Assemblyman, New York State Senator, and Acting Lieutenant Governor of New York
Frederick M. Reed, Vermont Attorney General
Joshua S. Salmon, represented the 4th congressional district of New Jersey from 1902 to 1903.
John L. Sampson, former Chairman of Senate Judiciary Committee, New York State Senator
Hiram Y. Smith, former U.S. Congressman
Dean P. Taylor, former U.S. Congressman
Michele Titus, New York State Assembly
James Manning Tyler, U.S. Congressman from Vermont
William Freeman Vilas, former U.S. Senator
Tom Vilsack, U.S. Secretary of Agriculture, former Governor of Iowa
Lovely A. Warren, Mayor of Rochester, New York
Frank L. Wiswall, New York State Assembly, New York State Senate
Lee Zeldin, U.S. Congressman

Practitioners
Stephen F. Brown, Union Army officer in the American Civil War
 James Campbell Matthews, First African American to graduate from law school in New York State
Wheeler Hazard Peckham, former nominee to the Supreme Court of the United States
David Soares, Albany County District Attorney
Mark Zaid, national security law expert

Other

John Sanford Barnes, Navy officer, naval historian
Jessica Bird, novelist
Barry M. Costello, Navy admiral
Charles Crozat Converse, composer
Marvin Dana, author and magazine editor
Kim Gannon, songwriter
Thomas Hamlin Hubbard, attorney, business executive, Union Army officer who attained the rank of brigadier general brevet.
Kristopher B. Jones, founder of Pepperjam and ReferLocal.com
Megyn Kelly, news anchor, Fox News Channel
Barry Kramer, pro basketball player and jurist
Richard Parsons, Chairman & former CEO of Time Warner; interim CEO of the Los Angeles Clippers
George W. Peckham, entomologist
Jeanine Pirro, commentator, Fox News Channel
Morris Silverman, philanthropist and businessman
Kate Stoneman, first woman admitted to the New York State Bar

References

External links 
 Notable Alumni

United States law-related lists